Bokondji "Boko" Imama (born August 3, 1996) is a Canadian professional ice hockey left winger for the Tucson Roadrunners of the American Hockey League (AHL) as a prospect for the Arizona Coyotes of the National Hockey League (NHL).

Playing career

Junior
The Baie-Comeau Drakkar of the Quebec Major Junior Hockey League selected Imama in the fourth round of the 2012 QMJHL Entry Draft. Imama joined the Drakkar for the 2012–13 QMJHL season.

Noted for his physicality, Imama spent parts of three seasons with the Drakkar before being traded to the Saint John Sea Dogs in 2014–15. After that season, the Tampa Bay Lightning selected Imama in the sixth round of the 2015 NHL Entry Draft. 

In December 2015, the QMJHL suspended Imama for 15 games after he came off the Sea Dogs' bench to defend 15-year-old teammate Joe Veleno during a brawl against the Halifax Mooseheads. Imama finished the 2015–16 season with 19 points in 48 games. 

The following year, Imama led the Sea Dogs and finished seventh in the QMJHL with 41 goals in 66 games. He added 15 points in 18 games during the 2017 QMJHL playoffs as the Sea Dogs won the President's Cup; in four games with Saint John at the 2017 Memorial Cup, Imama scored one goal and added two assists.

On May 31, 2017, the Lightning traded Imama to the Los Angeles Kings in exchange for a conditional seventh-round pick in the 2017 NHL Entry Draft. Imama signed a three-year entry-level contract with the Kings the following day.

Professional
Save for a brief stint with the ECHL's Manchester Monarchs in 2018–19, Imama spent the first four seasons of his professional career with the Ontario Reign of the American Hockey League. 

During the 2019–20 season, Imama was the target of a racist taunt by Bakersfield Condors defenceman Brandon Manning, resulting in a five-game suspension for Manning. On February 7, 2020, Imama and Manning faced each other in a game for the first time since the incident and fought early in the first period; Imama later added a goal and an assist to complete a Gordie Howe hat trick (and was named the game's third star) in what was ultimately a 10–3 Reign win.

On July 24, 2021, the Kings traded Imama and defenceman Cole Hults to the Arizona Coyotes in exchange for forwards Tyler Steenbergen and Brayden Burke.  

During his first season with the Coyotes' AHL affiliate, the Tucson Roadrunners, Imama was the target of a racist gesture by San Jose Barracuda forward Krystof Hrabik in a game on January 12, 2022. Later that month, the AHL suspended Hrabik for 30 games.

The Coyotes recalled Imama from the Roadrunners on April 22, 2022. He made his NHL debut that night against the Washington Capitals; the following day, Imama scored his first NHL goal against St. Louis Blues goaltender Jordan Binnington in a 5–4 Coyotes overtime loss.

Personal life
Imama was born in Montreal and has four sisters. His mother, Kumbia, and father, Bokondji, immigrated to Canada from the Democratic Republic of the Congo.

Career statistics

References

External links
 

1996 births
Living people
Arizona Coyotes players
Baie-Comeau Drakkar players
Black Canadian ice hockey players
Canadian people of Democratic Republic of the Congo descent
Ice hockey people from Quebec
Ontario Reign (AHL) players
Saint John Sea Dogs players
Tampa Bay Lightning draft picks
Tucson Roadrunners players